Muhammad Andy Harjito (born 27 September 2001) is an Indonesian professional footballer who plays as a attacking midfielder for Liga 1 club Borneo Samarinda.

Club career

Borneo Samarinda
He was signed for Borneo Samarinda to play in Liga 1 in the 2022 season. Harjito made his professional debut on 13 September 2022 and scored his first league in injury time of second half and saved Borneo Samarinda from losing to Bhayangkara. score draw 2–2. The goal he scored was the first in his career as a professional footballer. He scored his league goal for the club, opening the scoring in a 1–3 won against Bali United on 15 December 2022 at Sultan Agung Stadium.

Career statistics

Club

References

External links
 Andy Harjito at Soccerway
 Andy Harjito at Liga Indonesia

1999 births
Living people
Indonesian footballers
Association football midfielders
Liga 1 (Indonesia) players
Persiku Kudus players
Borneo F.C. players